Sandali is an administrative ward in the Temeke District of the Dar es Salaam Region of Tanzania. In 2016 the Tanzania National Bureau of Statistics report there were 65,943 people in the ward, from 52,660 in 2012.

References 

Temeke District
Wards of Dar es Salaam Region